The Warkawarka, also called Weki Weki, were an Australian Aboriginal group whose traditional lands are located in Victoria, Australia. Controversy exists as to whether they were an independent 'tribe' or rather consisted of a subgroup of the Wergaia, the latter view being shared by both Robert M. W. Dixon and Luise Hercus.

Name
The ethnonym seems to derive from their word for 'no' (warki=warka), though the name itself, warkawarka or wargawarga arguably may be a variant of the ethnonym for the Wergaia.

Country
Their western boundary lay along Hopetoun, and they also ranged over the Morton Plains.

Alternative names
 Booroung, Boorong
 Mirdiragoort
 Waikywaiky
 Weki-weki
 Wengenmarongeitch
 Werkawerka
 Wirtu, Wirtoo

Some words
 wirtu (man)

Notes

Citations

Sources

Aboriginal peoples of Victoria (Australia)
History of Victoria (Australia)